Baaji is a 2019 Pakistani romantic drama film, directed by Saqib Malik and produced by his Production company Page 33 Films. The film features Meera as Shameera Osman Khalid Butt as Rohail Khan/ Khalid Osman, Amna Ilyas as Neha, Mohsin Abbas Haider as Ajji, Ali Kazmi as Rammy , Nayyar Ejaz, and Nisho in pivotal roles. It is a dramatic tale of a fading Lollywood actress Shameera (Meera), who is not accepting that now her position in the industry is not much valuable. The story revolves around the relationship of Shameera with a Salon girl Neha (Amna Ilyas) who later becomes an assistant of Shameera and make this opportunity happens of working with an American Based Pakistani Director Rohail Khan (Osman Khalid Butt). Neha who belongs to a conservative lower middle class family then also make herself involved in Shameera's comeback movie titled Waapsi by helping them in rehearsals and script making so far she get a chance to take a supporting role in the movie. The film includes Ali Kazmi as Raamy (Shameera's Boyfriend) who is highly aggressive about Shameera.  Mohsin Abbas Haider plays the love interest of neha's character, while the Legendary actor Nayyer Ejaz supports the film by his great comics and unforgettable role as Chand Kamal, film also includes numerous well-known faces from the industry as in cameo appearances.

Cast
 Meera as Shameera
 Osman Khalid Butt as Rohail Khan
 Amna Ilyas as Neha
 Mohsin Abbas Haider as Ajji
 Ali Kazmi as Rameez Aslam (Rammy)
 Nayyar Ejaz as Chand Kamal
 Nisho as Dilshad Aapi
 Irfan Khosat as Stage Owner
 Ruhi Khan as Neha's Mother
 Aamir Qureshi as Police Inspector

Cameos
 Mehwish Hayat as herself
 Mahnoor as Item Girl
 Ali Saleem as Begum 
 Ayesha Sana as Salon Owner
 Humayun Saeed as himself
 Zeb Bangish as herself
 Yasir Hussain as Director
 Sania Saeed as Neha's Lawyer
 Mustafa Qureshi As Pehalwaan 
 Tapu Javeri as himself
 Tariq Amin as himself
 Frieha Altaf as herself
 Ali Azmat as himself
 Angeline malik as herself
 Juggan Kazim as herself
 Deepak Perwani as himself
 Muhammad Mubarik Ali as himself

Release
The first look teaser of the film was released on 23 April 2019. The teaser was highly appreciated by the audiences on every social media platform and have millions of shares on sites, later on the Theatrical trailer published on 30 May 2019 which truly inspires the cinema lovers all around. Critical response was also appreciative and in support of the film. The response from the general audiences changes right after the release of controversial song Gangster Guriya, however the Mehwish Hayat featured song controversy was sort of blessing in disguise for the movie, as films gets a huge public response on its release. The film was released on 28 June 2019 under the banner of ARY Films nationally and was also had an international release by B4U Films.
Baaji wasn't the first film which was distributed internationally by B4U Films as other Pakistani films such as Rangreza, Janaan, 7 Din Mohabbat In, Cake were also released by the same banner.

Home Media 
Baaji was made available for streaming on Amazon Prime Video in United States and United Kingdom in August, 2020. The film had a Television Premier on Eid al-Fitr, 26 May 2020, on ARY Digital.

Reception

Box office
The film collected 0.9 crores on its opening day and 0.95 crore on its second day. On its third day it collected 0.95 crore making a total gross of Rs 2.80 crores by the end of its opening weekend. It collected Rs 2.10 crores by the end of its second weekend. After the end of its run it earned Rs 12 crores domestically. The film was declared a commercial success.

Critical reception
Hassan Hassan of Galaxy Lollywood rated the film 3.5 out of 5 stars saying that "Baaji may just be the best cinematic work that portrays Lollywood's forgotten cinematic heritage on a colorful yet a dark palette". He praised the performances of Meera and Ilyas.

Soundtrack

Accolades

See also
 List of Pakistani films of 2019

References

External links
 

2019 romantic drama films
2010s Urdu-language films
Lollywood films
Pakistani romantic drama films
Films scored by Taha Malik
2019 films
Pakistani mystery films